Sigesbeckia is a genus of annual plants in the family Asteraceae. St. Paul's wort is a common name for some of the species. Sigesbeckia is widely distributed and has been traditionally used for the management of chronic diseases, including arthritis.

Origin
Sigesbeckia is named for a botanist Johann Georg Siegesbeck, who was a strong critic of Carl Linnaeus's botanic classification system. He was known to refer to it as "loathsome harlotry" because of the focus of the system upon the presence of (or lack of) sex organs in plants and their locations and groupings. Siegesbeck tried to refute Linnaeus' sexual classification system, but was unable to provide sound scholastic arguments to support his arguments.  Linnaeus proposed in Critica Botanica that there should be a link between the plant and the botanist after whom it was named. Considering the feud between Siegesbeck and Linnaeus, it is not unsurprising that in the classification book Hortus Cliffortianus, Linnaeus named a pungent weed Sigesbeckia.

Classification
Sigesbeckia is related to a group of South American plants variously known as subtribe Espeletiinae or the Espeletia complex, which include genera such as Axiniphyllum, Espeletia, Polymnia, Smallanthus, Rumfordia, Trigonospermum, and Unxia.

Some African Sigesbeckia species were transferred, at least by some authors, to Guizotia.

 Species

Traditional medicine
Three species of Sigesbeckia are used in traditional medicine: Sigesbeckia orientalis, Sigesbeckia pubescens, and Sigesbeckia glabracens, although the Royal Botanical Gardens, Kew, only recognizes two species, with Sigesbeckia pubescens considered a subspecies of Sigesbeckia orientalis.  In traditional medicine, the aerial parts of the plant are used to treat rheumatic conditions such as arthritis, joint pain, muscle pain, sciatica.  It is also used to treat hypertension. Use of Sigesbeckia as a traditional medicine dates back to at least 659 AD, when it was first referenced in Chinese materia medica. The traditional Chinese medicine is called xi xian cao, and is used to "dispel wind-dampness, to strengthen sinews, and for wind-heat-damp pain obstructions".

References

External links

 Sigesbeckia L. Subordinate Taxa 

Millerieae
Asteraceae genera